AJ Venter (born 29 July 1973) is a retired South African rugby union footballer, who played rugby for the Sharks in the international Super Rugby competition, and the  in the domestic Currie Cup competition. Venter also played for the South African national team, the Springboks.

Venter made his debut for South Africa on 26 November 2000 in a Test against Wales in Cardiff, and went on to represent the Springboks 25 times. His usual position was as flanker, but he also played at lock or No 8.

After retiring from professional rugby, Venter up-skilled himself within the financial sector and worked with institutions like ABSA and Old Mutual.

Early life and education

Playing career

In 2002, Venter, along with Richie McCaw of New Zealand, saved referee David McHugh from injury when a drunk South African fan ran onto the pitch during a 2002 Tri-Nations game between South Africa and New Zealand in Durban. McCaw wrestled the fan off the referee while Venter ran and tackled both McCaw and the fan to the ground before the rest of the players attempted to drag him off as security ran onto the field.

AJ Venter was selected for the second-string squad for the away legs of the 2007 Tri Nations Series in Australia and New Zealand as almost 20 first team players were either rested or injured. 
However he decided to retire from International rugby and hence withdrew from the Springboks touring squad.
His retirement meant that he also missed out on a possible World Cup place with the Springboks, but he cited personal and business commitments in Durban and South Africa as his reasons for the retirement.

Venter continued playing for the Sharks until the end of the 2008 Super 14 competition.

Later in the year, Venter rekindled his passion for the game after a lack of game time, including a controversial exclusion from the Sharks semi-final team. He joined the Stormers (Western Province) on a short-term contract, before finally hanging up his boots.

Personal life
Venter is in a relationship with Danielle Oldfield, a holistic dietitian and keynote speaker from Durban, he also had two divorces in his early life.
Venter has talked about going through a tough time in business post rugby and experiencing anxiety, he does a keynote on the lessons learned from these moments of hardship and runs a life skills program for school kids on how to navigate the challenging moments life throws at us.

References

External links
 www.lifewithaj.net
 Sharks profile
 AJ Venter on sporting-heroes.net
 AJ Venter to captain Sharks
 AJ Venter's Personal Web Page
 Profile on It's rugby

1973 births
Living people
South African rugby union players
South Africa international rugby union players
Golden Lions players
Lions (United Rugby Championship) players
Sharks (Currie Cup) players
Sharks (rugby union) players
Western Province (rugby union) players
Stormers players
Free State Cheetahs players
Rugby union number eights
Rugby union flankers
Rugby union locks
Afrikaner people
South African expatriate rugby union players
Expatriate rugby union players in Italy
South African expatriate sportspeople in Italy
South Africa international rugby sevens players
Male rugby sevens players
Rugby union players from the Free State (province)